Chiro Youth Movement Philippines (Filipino: Chiro Pilipinas) is a Philippine Catholic youth organisation. Chiro Philippines is a member of the umbrella of Catholic youth organizations Fimcap.

History 
In the 19th century the first structures of Catholic youth work developed in Europe and the Chiro movement emerged in Flanders. By Belgian missionaries the idea was brought also to the Philippines. Chiro was initiated in the Philippines on 10 January 1952 by Fr. Francis Gevers CICM.

References

Catholic youth organizations
Youth organizations based in the Philippines
Fimcap
Catholic Church in the Philippines